Cover Me Canada is a Canadian reality television competition show which airs on CBC Television. The show is a competition to find the most talented singer, rock band, group, or ensemble in Canada.

The show is hosted by Canadian-born pop singer Nicole Appleton and judged by Jordan Knight, Deborah Cox, and Ron Fair.

Contestants can select from four Canadian songs to cover: "Sundown" by Gordon Lightfoot, "Run to You" by Bryan Adams, "Life is a Highway" by Tom Cochrane or "Black Velvet" by Alannah Myles.

Format
The original format was created and developed by Jesse Fawcett and Kevin Healey at 11 Television and then sold to CBC.

Eight contestants are chosen from video auditions and are given a Canadian song to cover and perform live. At the end of the broadcast, viewers are asked to vote and share their favourites to earn them immunity from the next week's elimination.

Votes and online buzz are both factors to decide which competitor will be granted immunity and be safe from elimination by the judges.

Competitors

Ratings

References

External links 
 
 
 https://www.imdb.com/name/nm1435352
 https://web.archive.org/web/20180323012842/http://11television.com/

2011 Canadian television series debuts
2011 Canadian television series endings
2010s Canadian reality television series
2010s Canadian music television series
CBC Television original programming
Music competitions in Canada
Television series by Temple Street Productions